Philippe François Rouxel, viscount de Blanchelande (21 February 1735 – 15 April 1793) was a French military officer, nobleman and colonial administrator who served as the governor of Saint-Domingue from 1790 to 1792. He was born on 21 February 1735 in Dijon, France, and subsequently enlisted in the French Royal Army, rising to the rank of Maréchal de camp by 1781. In that year, Blanchelande led a French expeditionary force which captured Tobago from the British. He was subsequently made governor of the island, serving from 1781 to 1784.

Blanchelande subsequently succeeded Antoine de Thomassin de Peynier as governor of Saint-Domingue at the end of 1790. In 1791, during the Haitian Revolution, Rouxel led French troops against rebel slaves led by Dutty Boukman. In 1792, he was replaced as governor by Adrien-Nicolas Piédefer, marquis de La Salle, who would himself be replaced by François-Thomas Galbaud du Fort after June 1793. Convicted of counter-revolutionary actions and treason, Blanchelande was condemned to the guillotine by the Revolutionary Tribunal on 11 April 1793 and executed on 15 April.

Notes

External links
 The Louverture Project: Philibert François Rouxel de Blanchelande - Article from Haitian history wiki.

Governors of Trinidad and Tobago
Governors of Saint-Domingue
French military personnel of the American Revolutionary War
People of the Haitian Revolution
French people executed by guillotine during the French Revolution
Military personnel from Dijon
1735 births
1793 deaths